Sporobolus neglectus, common names small dropseed, small rushgrass, and  puffsheath dropseed, is a plant found in North America.  It is listed as endangered in Connecticut, Massachusetts, New Hampshire and New Jersey. It is listed is as endangered and extirpated in Maryland and as possibly extirpated in Maine.

References

Flora of North America
neglectus